Paula Janssen Moura (born January 19, 1996) is best known for being the drummer for the alternative rock band Quimere.

Biography
Paula is a Brazilian drummer, previously known for her participation in the band Los Compas, where she got to perform with bands like Kiara Rocks, Gloria and Forfun, in those with 4600 public in São Paulo.

With the end of the activities of Los Compas, Paula was invited by her colleague Vitor Assan to join the alternative project Quimere, where she has been working since 2017.

References

1996 births
Living people
People from São Paulo
Brazilian heavy metal drummers
Brazilian rock musicians
Musicians from São Paulo
Women drummers
Quimere members
21st-century women musicians
21st-century drummers
Women in metal